Steve De Wolf (born 31 August 1975 in Ninove) is a former Belgian cyclist.

Major results
1995
1st Internationale Wielertrofee Jong Maar Moedig
1996
3rd Circuit de Wallonie
1997
3rd Tour de Vendée

References

External links
 
 
 

1975 births
Living people
Belgian male cyclists
People from Ninove
Cyclists from East Flanders